A list of films produced in Turkey in 1978 (see 1978 in film):

See also
1978 in Turkey

References

Lists of Turkish films
1978